Philip "Phil" Andrew Brown (born 6 January 1962 in Birmingham, Warwickshire) is a British retired athlete who competed mainly in the 400 metres.

Athletics career
Brown was a member of Birchfield Harriers and an exceptional anchor leg relay runner, anchoring the British team to a number of medals. Brown's career highlight came when he competed for Great Britain in the 1984 Summer Olympics held in Los Angeles, United States in the 4 x 400 metre relay, where, in a dramatic final 100 m, he overtook Rick Mitchell of Australia and then Innocent Egbunike of Nigeria to claim the silver medal for Great Britain with his teammates Kriss Akabusi, Garry Cook and Todd Bennett. Brown's final leg time of 44.3 seconds resulted in a time of 2:59.13 which was a British and European record at the time and the first time a British team had bettered 3 minutes for the event.

The European Championships in 1982 saw the team, once again anchored by Brown, win the silver medal behind the West German team, in 3:00.68. At the Rome World Championships of 1987, he ran another excellent final leg in 44.3, which earned the team a silver medal in a European record time of 2:58.86.

He won an individual bronze medal and two team gold medals at the Commonwealth Games. He represented England and won a gold medal in the 4 x 400 metres event and finished sixth in the 400 metres, at the 1982 Commonwealth Games in Brisbane, Queensland, Australia. Four years later he represented England and won another gold medal in the 4 x 400 metres event, at the 1986 Commonwealth Games in Edinburgh, Scotland. He also earned an individual bronze at the Games in the 400 metres. A third and final Commonwealth appearance for England came at the 1990 Commonwealth Games in Auckland, New Zealand, where he competed in the 400 metres.

Personal life
Phil is now a conference speaker and was previously  the Regional Director for The Duke of Edinburgh's Award in the Midlands. After this he became a student mentor at Hilton Spencer Academy.

References

External links
 
 
 

1962 births
Living people
Sportspeople from Birmingham, West Midlands
English male sprinters
British male sprinters
Olympic athletes of Great Britain
Olympic silver medallists for Great Britain
Commonwealth Games medallists in athletics
Athletes (track and field) at the 1984 Summer Olympics
Athletes (track and field) at the 1988 Summer Olympics
Athletes (track and field) at the 1982 Commonwealth Games
Athletes (track and field) at the 1986 Commonwealth Games
Athletes (track and field) at the 1990 Commonwealth Games
World Athletics Championships athletes for Great Britain
World Athletics Championships medalists
European Athletics Championships medalists
Medalists at the 1984 Summer Olympics
Olympic silver medalists in athletics (track and field)
Commonwealth Games gold medallists for England
Commonwealth Games bronze medallists for England
Medallists at the 1982 Commonwealth Games
Medallists at the 1986 Commonwealth Games